Solvita is a Latvian feminine given name. The associated name day is January 1.

Notable people named Solvita
Solvita Āboltiņa (born 1963), Latvian politician

References 

Latvian feminine given names
Feminine given names